The 1992 Arab Cup is the sixth edition of the Arab Cup and also counted as the seventh edition of the 1992 Pan Arab Games football tournament, hosted by Syria, in 2 Provinces Aleppo and Damascus. Egypt won their first title of the Arab Cup and their third gold medal of the Pan Arab Games by beating Saudi Arabia in the final.

Part of the Pan Arab Games 
The 1992 edition organized as part of the 1992 Pan Arab Games football tournament was also counted as a part of the Arab Cup.

Participated teams

Iraq absent 
The most successful team and holder of the Arab Cup with four titles and the gold medalist holder in the Pan Arab Games football tournament, Iraq the defending champions banned for playing in the Arab Cup due to Gulf War.

Teams of the tournament 
Egypt participated with the olympic team. The 6 participated teams are:

Venues

Squads

Group stage

Group A

Group B

Knock-out stage

Semi-finals

Third place play-off

Final

Final ranking

References

External links 
 Details in RSSSF

 
1992
1992 in African football
1992 in Asian football
1992–93 in Saudi Arabian football
1992–93 in Syrian football
1992–93 in Kuwaiti football
September 1992 sports events in Asia